Chippewa Bay is a hamlet in St. Lawrence County, New York, United States. Chippewa Bay has a post office with ZIP code 13623, which opened on August 3, 1880.

References

Hamlets in St. Lawrence County, New York
Hamlets in New York (state)